John Robert Marzano (February 14, 1963 – April 19, 2008), commonly referred to as "Johnny Marz", was an American professional baseball catcher, who played in Major League Baseball (MLB) for the Boston Red Sox, Texas Rangers, and Seattle Mariners, from  to  and  to . Generally utilized as a backup catcher, Marzano was a member of division champions with the 1988 and 1990 Red Sox, and the 1997 Mariners, for whom he posted a .287 batting average. Marzano batted and threw right-handed.

Early life
Born in Philadelphia, Pennsylvania, Marzano graduated from its Central High School, and briefly attended Holy Family College, studying radiologic technology. He attended Temple University, where he played catcher for the Owls' baseball team from 1982 to 1984. In 1982, he played collegiate summer baseball with the Wareham Gatemen of the Cape Cod Baseball League. Marzano finished his collegiate career with a .413 batting average. Named an All-American by three different organizations in 1984, he batted .448, with 15 home runs, and 61 RBI. Marzano finished his career as the all-time Temple University leader in batting average, slugging percentage, and home runs. 

In the 1984 Major League Baseball draft, Marzano was selected in the first round, 14th overall, by the Boston Red Sox of the American League (AL) and was a member of the silver medal-winning Team USA at the 1984 Olympic Games.

Professional career
As a reserve catcher with the Mariners in 1996, Marzano became a cult hero in Seattle when he threw a haymaker at New York Yankees outfielder Paul O'Neill during a game in the Kingdome on Wednesday,  It occurred after O'Neill complained to the umpire about a pitch from reliever  was high and inside; the ensuing brawl in the eighth inning resulted in six ejections , including Marzano‘s own.

In later years, Marzano was a frequent guest of Phillies Post Game Live on Comcast SportsNet. He co-hosted a show with Rob Charry on Saturdays, and was also a regular guest on WIP's morning show. Marzano also appeared often on AT&T Daily News Live with Michael Barkann, on Comcast SportsNet. The Marzano Baseball Academy, founded in 1991, bears his name.

At the time of his death, Marzano was in his second year of work with Major League Baseball's BaseballChannel.tv. He co-hosted the show Leading Off with Vinny Micucci every weekday morning.

Death
Marzano died unexpectedly, April 19, 2008, at age 45, at his home on Passyunk Avenue, in the city's South Philadelphia neighborhood. He was found after having fallen down a flight of stairs. It was originally speculated that Marzano may have suffered a heart attack, but the Medical Examiner's Office revealed in its July 17 report that Marzano‘s death was actually caused by positional asphyxia, due to the way his body landed after the fall. His last public appearance was on Daily News Live, on Thursday, April 17, from the Wachovia Center. Marzano is survived by his wife, two daughters, and two grandchildren. He is buried at the Holy Cross Cemetery in Yeadon, Pennsylvania.

References

External links

John Marzano Baseball Academy / Tribute Site
John Marzano at The Deadball Era

1963 births
2008 deaths
Accidental deaths from falls
Accidental deaths in Pennsylvania
Baseball players at the 1983 Pan American Games
Baseball players at the 1984 Summer Olympics
Baseball players from Philadelphia
Boston Red Sox players
Burials in Pennsylvania
Central High School (Philadelphia) alumni
Charlotte Knights players
Charlotte Rangers players
Deaths from asphyxiation
Major League Baseball catchers
Medalists at the 1984 Summer Olympics
New Britain Red Sox players
Oklahoma City 89ers players
Oklahoma RedHawks players
Olympic silver medalists for the United States in baseball
Pan American Games bronze medalists for the United States
Pan American Games medalists in baseball
Pawtucket Red Sox players
Scranton/Wilkes-Barre Red Barons players
Seattle Mariners players
Temple Owls baseball players
Texas Rangers players
Wareham Gatemen players
All-American college baseball players
Medalists at the 1983 Pan American Games